ʿAlī ibn Abī Ṭālib (600 – 661 CE) was the last Caliph of the Rashidun Caliphate, the successor state to the Islamic prophet Muhammad's political dominions. He is considered by Shia Muslims to be the first Imam, the rightful religious and political successor to Muhammad. The issue of succession caused a major rift between Muslims and divided them into two major branches: Shia following an appointed hereditary leadership among Ali's descendants, and Sunni following political dynasties. Ali's assassination in the Grand Mosque of Kufa by a Kharijite coincided with the rise of the Umayyad Caliphate. The Imam Ali Shrine and the city of Najaf were built around Ali's tomb and it is visited yearly by millions of devotees.

Ali was a cousin and son-in-law of Muhammad, raised by him from the age of 5, and accepted his claim of divine revelation by age 11, being among the first to do so. Ali played a pivotal role in the early years of Islam while Muhammad was in Mecca and under severe persecution. After Muhammad's relocation to Medina in 622, Ali married his daughter Fatima and, among others, fathered Hasan and Husayn, the second and third Shia Imams. 

Muhammad called him his brother, guardian and successor, and he was the flag bearer in most of the wars and became famous for his bravery. On his return from the Farewell Pilgrimage, Muhammad uttered the phrase, "Whoever I am his , this Ali is his Mawla." But the meaning of Mawla became disputed. Shias believed that Ali was appointed by Muhammad to lead Islam, and Sunnis interpreted the word as friendship and love. While Ali was preparing Muhammad's body for burial, a group of Muslims met and pledged allegiance to Abu Bakr. Ali pledged allegiance to Abu Bakr, after six months, but did not take part in the wars and political activity, except for the election of Uthman, the third caliph. However, he advised the three caliphs in religious, judicial, and political matters.

After Uthman was killed, Ali was elected as the next Caliph, which coincided with the first civil wars between Muslims. Ali faced two separate opposition forces: a group in Mecca, who wanted to convene a council to determine the caliphate; and another group led by Mu'awiya in the Levant, who demanded revenge for Uthman's blood. He defeated the first group; but in the end, the Battle of Siffin led to an arbitration that favored Mu'awiya, who eventually defeated Ali militarily. Slain by the sword of Ibn Muljam Moradi, Ali was buried outside the city of Kufa. In the eyes of his admirers, he became an example of piety and un-corrupted Islam, as well as the chivalry of pre-Islamic Arabia. Several books are dedicated to his hadiths, sermons, and prayers, the most famous of which is Nahj al-Balagha.

Early life
Ali was born to Abu Talib and his wife Fatima bint Asad around 600 CE, possibly on 13 Rajab, the date also celebrated annually by the Shia. Shia and some Sunni sources introduce Ali as the only person born inside Ka'ba in Mecca, some containing miraculous descriptions of the incident. Ali's father was a leading member of the Banu Hashim clan, who also raised his nephew Muhammad after his parents died. When Abu Talib fell into poverty later, Ali was taken in at the age of five and raised by Muhammad and his wife Khadija.

In 610, when Ali was aged between nine to eleven, Muhammad announced that he had received divine revelations. Ali was among the first to believe him and profess to Islam, either the second (after Khadija) or the third (after Khadija and Abu Bakr), a point of contention among Shia and Sunni Muslims. Gleave nevertheless writes that the earliest sources seem to place Ali before Abu Bakr, while Watt comments that Abu Bakr's status after Muhammad's death might have been reflected back into the early Islamic records.

Muhammad's call to Islam in Mecca lasted from 610 to 622, during which Ali provided for the needs of the Meccan Islamic community, especially the poor. Some three years after the first revelation and after receiving verse 26:214, Muhammad gathered his relatives for a feast, invited them to Islam, and asked for their assistance. The Sunni al-Tabari writes that Ali was the only relative who offered his support and Muhammad subsequently announced him as his brother, his trustee, and his successor. This declaration was met with ridicule from the infamous Abu Lahab and the guests then dispersed. The announcement attributed to Muhammad is not included in the Sunni collection Musnad Ahmad ibn Hanbal, but readily found in the Shia exegeses of verse 26:214. The similar account of Ibn Ishaq in his Sira was later omitted in the recension of the book by the Sunni Ibn Hisham, possibly because of its Shia implications. The Shia interpretation of these accounts is that Muhammad had already designated Ali as his successor from an early age.

From migration to Medina to the death of Muhammad
In 622, Muhammad was informed of an assassination plot by the Meccan elites and it was Ali who is said to have stayed in Muhammad's house overnight to fool the assassins waiting outside, while the latter escaped to Yathrib (now Medina), thus marking 1 AH in the Islamic calendar. This incident is given by the early exegete Ibn Abbas and some others as the reason of the revelation for verse 2:207, "But there is also a kind of man who gives his life away to please God..." Ali too escaped Mecca soon after returning the goods entrusted to Muhammad there. In Medina, Muhammad paired Muslims for fraternity pacts and he is said to have selected Ali as his brother, telling him, "You are my brother in this world and the Hereafter," according to the canonical Sunni collection Sahih al-Tirmidhi. Ali soon married Muhammad's daughter Fatima in 1 or 2 AH (623-5 CE), at the age of about twenty-two. Their union holds a special spiritual significance for Muslims, write Nasr and Afsaruddin, and Muhammad said he followed divine orders to marry Fatima to Ali, narrates the Sunni al-Suyuti, among others. The Sunni Ibn Sa'd and some others write that Muhammad had earlier turned down the marriage proposals by Abu Bakr and Umar.

Event of Mubahala
Verse 3:61 of the Quran is associated with this incident. Madelung argues based on this verse that Muhammad participated in this event alongside Ali, Fatima, and their two sons, Hasan and Husayn. This is also the Shia view. In contrast, most Sunni accounts by al-Tabari do not name the participants of the event, while some other Sunni historians agree with the Shia view. During the event, Muhammad gathered Ali, Fatima, Hasan and Husayn under his cloak and addressed them as his , according to some Shia and Sunni sources, including the canonical Sunni Sahih Muslim and Sahih al-Tirmidhi. Madelung suggests that their inclusion by Muhammad in this significant ritual must have raised the religious rank of his family. A similar view is voiced by Lalani.

Missions
Ali acted as Muhammad's secretary and deputy in Medina. He was also one of the scribes tasked by Muhammad with committing the Quran to writing. In 628, Ali wrote down the terms of the Treaty of Hudaybiyyah, the peace treaty between Muhammad and the Quraysh. At the request of Muhammad, Ali helped ensure that the Conquest of Mecca in 630 was bloodless and later removed the idols from Ka'ba. In 631, Ali was sent to Yemen to spread the teachings of Islam, as a consequence of which the Hamdanids peacefully converted. Ali was also tasked with resolving the dispute with the Banu Jadhima, some of whom had been killed by Khalid ibn al-Walid after being promised safety by him.

Military career

Ali accompanied Muhammad in all of his military expeditions except the Battle of Tabuk (630), during which he was left behind in charge of Medina. The Hadith of Position is linked with this occasion, "Are you not content, Ali, to stand to me as Aaron stood to Moses, except that there will be no prophet after me?" This appears in Sahih al-Bukhari and Sahih Muslim. For the Shia, the hadith signifies Ali's usurped right to succeed Muhammad, while it primarily supports the finality of Muhammad in the chain of prophets for the Sunni. Ali commanded the expedition to Fadak (628) in the absence of Muhammad.

Ali was renowned for his bravery. He was the standard-bearer in the Battle of Badr (624) and the Battle of Khaybar (628). He vigorously defended Muhammad in the Battle of Uhud (625) and the Battle of Hunayn (630), while Veccia Vaglieri attributes the Muslims' victory in the Battle of Khaybar to his courage, where he is popularly said to have torn off the iron gate of the enemy fort. At Uhud, Muhammad reported hearing a divine voice, "[There is] no sword but Zulfiqar [Ali's sword], [there is] no chivalrous youth but Ali," writes al-Tabari. After defeating Amr ibn Abd Wudd, who had challenged Ali to single combat in the Battle of the Trench (627), Muhammad praised him, "Faith, in its entirety, has appeared before polytheism, in its entirety," writes the Shia Rayshahri. According to Veccia Vaglieri, Ali and Zubayr oversaw the killing of the Banu Qurayza men for treachery in 5 AH, though the historicity of this incident has been disputed by some, while Shah-Kazemi comments on the defensive nature of the battles fought by Ali and his magnanimity towards his defeated enemies.

Ghadir Khumm

As Muhammad was returning from the Farewell Pilgrimage in 632, he halted the large caravan of pilgrims at Ghadir Khumm and addressed them after the congregational prayer. During his sermon, taking Ali by the hand, Muhammad asked the crowd if he was not closer to the believers than they were to themselves, which they affirmed. Muhammad then declared, "He whose  I am, Ali is his ." Musnad Ibn Hanbal, a canonical Sunni source, adds that Muhammad repeated this sentence three or four more times and that his companion Umar congratulated Ali after the sermon, "You have now become  of every faithful man and woman." In this sermon and earlier in Mecca, Muhammad is said to have alerted Muslims about his impending death. Shia sources describe the event in greater detail, linking the event to the revelation of verses 5:3 and 5:67 of the Quran.

With some exceptions, the authenticity of the Ghadir Khumm is rarely contested, as its recorded tradition is "among the most extensively acknowledged and substantiated" in classical Islamic sources. The numerous Shia accounts include one by the proto-Shia Ya'qubi, while the Sunni accounts include the s of al-Tirmidhi, al-Nasa'i, Ibn Maja, Abu Dawud, and the works of Ibn al-Athir, Ibn Abd al-Barr, Ibn Abd Rabbih, Jahiz, Ibn Asakir, and Ibn Kathir. Some Sunni authors, such as al-Tabari, Ibn Hisham, and Ibn Sa'd nevertheless made little or no mention of the Ghadir Khumm, perhaps because the story seem to justify the Shia claims, or perhaps to avoid angering their Sunni rulers by supporting the Shia claims.

The interpretation of the Ghadir Khumm is a source of controversy between Sunni and Shia.  is a polysemous Arabic word, its interpretation in the context of the Ghadir Khumm tends to be split along sectarian lines. Shia sources interpret  as meaning 'leader', 'master', and 'patron',  while Sunni accounts of this sermon offer little explanation, or interpret the hadith as love or support for Ali, or substitute  with the word  (of God). As such, Shias view the Ghadir Khumm as the investiture of Ali with Muhammad's religious and political authority, while Sunnis regard it as a statement about the rapport between the two men, or that Ali should execute Muhammad's will. On one occasion during his caliphate, Ali is known to have asked Muslims to come forward with their testimonies about the Ghadir Khumm, presumably to counter the challenges to his legitimacy as caliph. Madelung, McHugo, and Shah-Kazemi suggest that Ali thereby claimed to have been entrusted by Muhammad with an authority superior to his predecessors, while Afsaruddin notes that the Sunni al-Bukhari and Muslim ibn al-Hajjaj have not recorded the event in their canonical works. The latter does relate a public statement attributed to Muhammad at Khumm in praise of the Banu Hashim, not just Ali.

Life under Rashidun Caliphs
The next phase of Ali's life started in 632, after the death of Muhammad, and lasted until the assassination of Uthman ibn Affan, the third caliph, in 656. During those 24 years, Ali took no part in battle or conquest.

Succession to Muhammad

Saqifa
As Ali and other close relatives prepared for the burial of Muhammad, a group of the Ansar (Medinan natives) gathered at the Saqifa to discuss the future of Muslims or to re-establish their control over their city, Medina. Upon learning about this, Abu Bakr and Umar, both senior companions of Muhammad, rushed to join the gathering as the only representatives of the Muhajirun (Meccan converts) at the Saqifa, alongside Abu Ubaidah. Those present at the Saqifa appointed Abu Bakr as the successor to Muhammad after a heated debate that is said to have become violent.

The case of Ali for the caliphate was unsuccessfully brought up at the Saqifa in his absence, though Madelung and MucHugo suggest that the outcome would have been different in a broad council with Ali as a candidate: The Ansar would have supported him because of his family ties with them, and the additional backing of the Banu Hashim and the powerful Abd Shams clans of the Quraysh would have carried Ali to the caliphate. On the one hand, the same arguments that Abu Bakr advanced against the Ansar (kinship, service to Islam, lineage, etc.) would have likely favored Ali over Abu Bakr. On the other hand, Sunni authors often justify the caliphate of Abu Bakr on the basis that he led the some of the prayers in Muhammad's final days, though the veracity and political significance of such reports have been challenged by Jafri, Lecomte,  and Shaban. Alternatively, Veccia Vaglieri believes that the Arabs' (pre-Islamic) tradition of choosing elderly leaders weakened the case of Ali, while some others note that the tradition of hereditary succession among the Quraysh would have favored Ali over Abu Bakr. Umar later described the Saqifa affair as a  [i.e., a precipitate and ill-considered deal], possibly because it excluded from decision making the majority of the Muhajirun and particularly Muhammad's kin. Jafri and Momen similarly comment that the caliphate of Abu Bakr was the decision of a group of companions, successfully imposed upon others due to their clan rivalries. Some other contemporary authors have criticized the Saqifa affair as a "backroom deal" and a "coup" which was influenced by the pre-Islamic tribal politics.

Opposition of Ali
After the Saqifa meeting, Omar and his supporters dominated the streets of Medina, and the caliphate of Abu Bakr was met with little resistance there. The Banu Hashim and some companions of Muhammad soon gathered in protest at Ali's house, among them Muhammad's uncle Abbas and Zubayr. These held Ali to be the rightful successor to Muhammad, possibly referring to the announcement by the latter at the Ghadir Khumm. Among others, al-Tabari reports that Umar then led an armed mob to Ali's residence and threatened to set the house on fire if Ali and his supporters would not pledge their allegiance to Abu Bakr. The scene soon grew violent, but the mob retreated without Ali's pledge after his wife Fatima pleaded with them. Abu Bakr later placed a boycott on Ali and also on the Banu Hashim to abandon their support for Ali. The boycott was successful, and those who initially supported Ali gradually turned away and pledged their allegiance to Abu Bakr. Most likely, Ali did not pay his allegiance to Abu Bakr until his wife Fatima died within six months of her father Muhammad. In Shia sources, the death (and miscarriage) of the young Fatima are attributed to an attack on her house to subdue Ali at the order of Abu Bakr. Sunnis categorically reject these claims.

After the death of Fatima and in the absence of popular support, Ali is said to have relinquished his claims to the caliphate for the sake of the unity of a nascent Islam. In particular, he turned down proposals to forcefully pursue the caliphate, including an offer from Abu Sufyan, which led Veccia Vaglieri to conclude that Ali had no interest in the caliphate. In contrast, others maintain that Ali viewed himself as the most qualified person to lead the Muslim community after Muhammad by virtue of his merits and his kinship with Muhammad, while there is some evidence that Ali also considered himself as the designated successor of Muhammad through a divine decree at the Ghadir Khumm. In contrast with the lifetime of Muhammad, Ali is believed to have retired from public life during the caliphates of Abu Bakr, Umar, and Uthman, which has been interpreted as a silent censure of the first three caliphs. While he reputedly advised Abu Bakr and Umar on government and religious matters, the mutual distrust and hostility of Ali with the two caliphs is also well-documented, but largely downplayed or ignored in Sunni sources. Their differences were epitomized during the proceedings of the electoral council in 644 when Ali refused to be bound by the precedence of the first two caliphs. The conflicts after the death of Muhammad are considered the roots of the current division among Muslims. Those who had accepted Abu Bakr's caliphate later became the Sunnis, while the supporters of Ali's right to the caliphate eventually became the Shias.

Caliphate of Abu Bakr
In contrast with the lifetime of Muhammad, Ali retired from the public life during the caliphate of Abu Bakr, did not take part in the Ridda wars, and instead engaged himself with religious affairs, devoting his time to the study and teaching of the Quran. The caliphate of Abu Bakr began with a conflict between him and Fatima, Muhammad's daughter and the wife of Ali. When she requested her inheritance from the estate of his father, including the  lands of Fadak and Khaybar, Abu Bakr refused, saying that Muhammad had told him, "We, the prophets, do not leave any inheritance; whatever we leave is charity," as related by al-Tabari. The first caliph was initially the sole witness to this statement, and Soufi regards him as the only credible narrator of this hadith in Sunni sources, while Sajjadi adds also his daughter Aisha and his ally Umar. In contrast, Twelvers reject the authenticity of the hadith based on their own traditions, claiming also that it contradicts the Quran, where verses 19:6 and 27:16 describe how Zechariah and David both left inheritance. These ostensible contradictions with the Quran have also been noted by some contemporary authors. Nevertheless, Soufi suggests that the testimony of Abu Bakr is strong enough for Sunnis to make an exception to the Quranic rules of inheritance. Abu Bakr announced that he would administer those properties like Muhammad and that his kin should henceforth rely on general alms, which was forbidden for them in his lifetime because of their status of purity in the Quran, as preserved today by all schools of jurisprudence in Islam. Because Muhammad had become the owner of Fadak as the leader of the Muslim community, to inherit this property as a prerogative by the Banu Hashim might have implied their authority over the community, which is likely why Abu Bakr rejected Fatima's claims. This was the opinion of Jafri, and the views of some contemporary authors are alike.

Another incident in this period was the death of Fatima. Shortly after the appointment of Abu Bakr, Umar led an armed mob to the house of Ali, who had withheld his pledge, and threatened to set the house on fire if Ali and those with him did not pay allegiance to Abu Bakr. The scene soon grew violent, but the mob retreated after Fatima publicly shamed them, without receiving Ali's pledge, who withheld his oath until after the death of Fatima, some six months after Muhammad. Shia sources describe a final and violent raid to secure the oath of Ali, also led by Umar, in which Fatima suffered injuries that shortly led to her miscarriage and death. Any violence is categorically rejected by Sunnis, though there is evidence in their early sources that a mob entered Fatima's house by force and arrested Ali, which Abu Bakr regretted on his deathbed. Fitzpatrick surmises that the story of the altercation reflects the political agendas of the period and should therefore be treated with caution. In contrast, Veccia Vaglieri maintains that the Shia account is based on facts, even if it has been later exaggerated. Madelung is uncertain about the use of force but writes that Fatima's house was searched in some Sunni sources, adding that Ali later repeatedly said that he would have resisted (Abu Bakr) had there been forty men with him. Abbas writes that some well-regarded Sunni sources mention Umar's raid and Fatima's injuries.

Caliphate of Umar
On his deathbed in 634, Abu Bakr appointed Umar as his successor, which led Lalani to conclude that Muhammad had similarly appointed Ali but his choice was ignored by the community. Ali was not consulted about the matter, and the nomination of Umar was met with resistance from some companions, but Abu Bakr ultimately secured the endorsement of key figures. Ali did not press any claims, possibly fearing division in Islam, and remained withdrawn from public affairs during the caliphate of Umar. Any disagreements between Ali and Umar are often minimized by Sunni authors, who say that Ali was consulted in matters of state, while Shia sources highlight the conflicts between the two, and their mutual dislike is clear in the Sunni Tarikh al-Tabari. Unlike his legal advice, which was accepted because of his "excellent knowledge of the Quran and the Sunna," political views of Ali were probably ignored by Umar: Ali advised Umar in vain that all the excess state revenues should be equally distributed among Muslims, following the practice of Muhammad and Abu Bakr. He was also absent from the strategic meeting of the notables convened by Umar near Damascus because, according to al-Tabari, he had stayed behind as the governor of Medina in the absence of Umar, though it is said that he held no other positions under the second caliph. Ali also did not participate in the military expeditions of Umar, although he does not seem to have objected to them, according to Gleave. At the same time, Ali is credited with the idea of adopting  as the start of the Islamic calendar introduced by Umar. The Sunni Kitab al-Isti'ab and the Shia Bihar al-anwar attribute to Umar, "Had there not been Ali, Umar would have perished." A similar sentiment is expressed by Umar in the Sunni al-Bidaya wa'l-nihaya. 

Umar evidently opposed the combination of the prophethood and the caliphate in the Banu Hashim, and he thus prevented Muhammad from dictating his will on his deathbed, possibly fearing that he might expressly designate Ali as his successor. Nevertheless, perhaps realizing the necessity of Ali's cooperation in his collaborative scheme of governance, Umar made some overtures to Ali and the Banu Hashim during his caliphate without giving them excessive economic and political power. He returned Muhammad's estates in Medina to Ali and Muhammad's uncle Abbas as an endowment, though Fadak and Khayber remained under the control of the caliph. Umar also insisted on marrying Ali's daughter Umm Kulthum, to which Ali reluctantly agreed after the former enlisted public support for his demand.

Election of Uthman (644)

Umar was stabbed in 23/644 by Abu Lu'lu'a Firuz, a disgruntled Persian slave. On his deathbed, he tasked a small committee with choosing the next caliph among themselves. The committee members were all early companions of Muhammad from the Quraysh, but Ali and Uthman ibn Affan were most likely the strongest candidates among them. The deciding vote was given to another member named Abd al-Rahman ibn Awf, either by the committee, or by Umar. Ibn Awf appointed his brother-in-law Uthman as the next caliph, after Ali rejected his condition to follow the precedent of the first two caliphs if elected, or gave an evasive answer, while Uthman readily accepted this condition. Umar has been criticized by some authors for his exclusion of the Ansar from the committee, and for its evident bias toward Uthman, both of which were intended to keep the caliphate away from the Banu Hashim, or perhaps the bias of the committee was accidental.

Caliphate of Uthman

Ali frequently accused Uthman of deviating from the Quran and the Sunna, and he was joined in this criticism by most of the senior companions. Uthman was also widely accused of nepotism, corruption, and injustice, and Ali is known to have protested his conduct, including his lavish gifts for his kinsmen. Ali also protected outspoken companions, such as Abu Dharr and Ammar, against the wrath of the caliph. Ali appears in early sources as a restraining influence on Uthman without directly opposing him. Some supporters of Ali were part of the opposition to Uthman, joined in their efforts by Talha and Zubayr, who were both companions of Muhammad, and by his widow Aisha. Among the supporters were Malik al-Ashtar and the other religiously-learned . These wanted to see Ali as the next caliph, though there is no evidence that he communicated or coordinated with them. Ali is also said to have rejected the requests to lead the rebels, although he might have sympathized with their grievances, and was thus considered a natural focus for the opposition, at least morally.

Assassination of Uthman 
As their grievances mounted, discontented groups from provinces began arriving in Medina in 35/656. On their first attempt, the Egyptian opposition sought the advice of Ali, who urged them to send a delegation to negotiate with Uthman, unlike Talha and Ammar who might have encouraged the Egyptians to advance on the town. Ali similarly asked the Iraqi opposition to avoid violence, which was heeded. He also acted as a mediator between Uthman and the provincial dissidents more than once to address their economical and political grievances. In particular, he negotiated and guaranteed on behalf of Uthman the promises that persuaded the rebels to return home and ended the first siege. Ali then urged Uthman to publicly repent, which he did. The caliph soon retracted his statement, however, possibly because his secretary Marwan convinced him that repentance would only embolden the opposition. On their way back home, some Egyptian rebels intercepted an official letter ordering their punishment. They now returned to Medina and laid siege to Uthman's residence for a second time, demanding that he abdicates. The caliph refused and claimed he was unaware of the letter, for which Marwan is often blamed in the early sources. Ali and another companion sided with Uthman about the letter, and suspected Marwan, though a report by the Sunni al-Baladhuri suggests that the caliph accused Ali. This is likely when Ali refused to further intercede for Uthman. The caliph was assassinated soon afterward in the final days of 35 AH (June 656) by the Egyptian rebels during a raid on his residence in Medina.

Ali played no role in the deadly attack, and his son Hasan was injured while guarding Uthman's besieged residence at the request of Ali. He also convinced the rebels not to prevent the delivery of water to Uthman's house during the siege. Beyond this, historians disagree about his measures to protect the third caliph. Husain Mohammed Jafri and Madelung highlight multiple attempts by Ali for reconciliation, and Martin Hinds believes that Ali could not have done anything more for Uthman. Reza Shah-Kazemi points to Ali's "constructive criticism" of Uthman and his opposition to violence, while Moojan Momen writes that Ali mediated between Uthman and the rebels, all the time urging the former to alter his policies and refusing the requests from the latter to lead them. This is similar to the view of John McHugo, who adds that Ali withdrew in frustration when his peace efforts where undone by Marwan. Fred Donner and Robert Gleave suggest that Ali was the immediate beneficiary of Uthman's death. This is challenged by Madelung, who suggests that Aisha would have not actively opposed Uthman if Ali had been the prime mover of the rebellion and its future beneficiary. He and others observe the hostility of Aisha toward Ali, which resurfaced immediately after his accession. Laura Veccia Vaglieri notes that Ali refused to lead the rebellion but sympathized with them and probably agreed with their calls for abdication. Hossein Nasr and Asma Afsaruddin, Levi della Vida, and Julius Wellhausen believe that Ali remained neutral, while Caetani labels Ali as the chief culprit in the murder of Uthman, even though the evidence suggests otherwise.

Caliphate

Election

When Uthman was killed in 656 CE by the Egyptian rebels, the potential candidates for caliphate were Ali and Talha. The Umayyads had fled Medina, and the provincial rebels and the Ansar were in control of the city. Among the Egyptians, Talha enjoyed some support, but the Basrans and Kufans, who had heeded Ali's opposition to violence, and most of the Ansar supported Ali. Some authors add the (majority of the) Muhajirun to the above list of Ali's supporters. The key tribal chiefs also favored Ali at the time.

The caliphate was offered by these groups to Ali, who was initially reluctant to accept it, saying that he preferred to be a minister. He was reluctant perhaps because he saw the polarizing impact of the assassination on the community, suggests Reza Aslan. Some early reports emphasize that Ali then accepted the caliphate when it became clear that he enjoyed popular support, reporting also that Ali demanded a public pledge at the mosque. Malik al-Ashtar might have been the first to pledge his allegiance to Ali. Talha and Zubayr, both companions of Muhammad with ambitions for the high office, also gave their pledges to Ali but later broke their oaths. Some early sources say that they pledged under duress, though contemporary historians tend to reject their claims as invented. It appears that Ali personally did not force anyone and, among others, Sa'ad ibn Abi Waqqas, Abd-Allah ibn Umar,  Sa'id ibn al-As, al-Walid ibn Uqba, and Marwan likely refused to give their oaths, some motivated by personal grudges against Ali. On the whole, Madelung suggests that there is less evidence for any violence here than in the case of Abu Bakr, even though many broke with Ali later, claiming that they had pledged under duress. At the same time, that the majority favored Ali in Medina might have created an intimidating atmosphere for those opposed to him.

Legitimacy 
For Veccia Vaglieri, that Ali allowed himself to be nominated by the rebels was an error, because it left him exposed to accusations of complicity in the assassination. Alternatively, M.A. Shaban and Sean Anthony believe that Ali stepped in to prevent chaos and fill the power vacuum created by the regicide. The opinion of Mahmoud M. Ayoub is close. Madelung is critical that Ali was elected irregularly and not by a council, while Hugh N. Kennedy and Veccia Vaglieri write that the election of Ali faced little public opposition, and this is also implied by Shaban. Jafri and Momen suggest that Ali was elected by a near-consensus, commenting that he was the only popularly-elected caliph in Muslim history. The latter part is also echoed by Ayoub. Even though underprivileged groups rallied around Ali, he had limited support among the powerful Quraysh, some of whom aspired to the title of caliph. Within the Quraysh, Madelung identifies two camps opposed to Ali: the Umayyads, who believed that the caliphate was their right after Uthman, and those who wished to restore the caliphate of Quraysh on the same principles laid by Abu Bakr and Umar (rather than the caliphate of Muhammad's clan, the Banu Hashim). Madelung considers the latter group as the majority within the Quraysh. Kennedy similarly writes that the Quraysh challenged Ali to preserve the status of their tribe. Ali was vocal about the divine and exclusive right of Muhammad's kin to succeed him, which would have jeopardized the future ambitions of other Qurayshites for leadership.

Administrative policies

Justice 
The caliphate of Ali was characterized by his strict justice. In his inaugural speech, Ali rebuked Muslims for straying from the straight path after Muhammad and set out to implement radical policies, intended to restore his vision of the prophetic governance. The caliph immediately dismissed nearly all the governors who had served Uthman, saying that the likes of those men should not be appointed to any office. He replaced them with men whom he considered pious, largely from the Ansar and the Banu Hashim. Ali also distributed the treasury funds equally among Muslims, following the practice of Muhammad, and is said to have shown zero tolerance for corruption. Some of those affected by these policies soon revolted against Ali under the pretext of revenge for Uthman. Among them was Mu'awiya, the incumbent governor of Syria. Some have criticized Ali for political naivety and excessive rigorism, while others say that Ali ruled with righteousness rather than political flexibility. His supporters identify similar decisions of Muhammad, and assert that Islam never allows for compromising on a just cause, quoting verse 68:9, "They wish that thou might compromise and that they might compromise." Some suggest that the decisions of Ali were actually justified on a practical level. For instance, the removal of unpopular governors might have been the only option available to Ali because injustice was the main grievance of the rebels.

Religious authority 
Ali viewed himself not only as the temporal leader of the Muslim community but also as its exclusive religious authority, as evident from his inaugural speech as the caliph. Ali thus laid claim to the religious authority to interpret the Quran and Sunnah, and particularly the esoteric message of the script. This claim of Ali distinguished him from his predecessors who may be viewed as merely the administrators of the divine law. In return, some supporters of Ali indeed held him as their divinely-guided leader who demanded the same type of loyalty that Muhammad did. These felt an absolute and all-encompassing bond of spiritual loyalty to Ali that transcended politics, and offered him a second and unconditional  to him after the Kharijites broke with Ali. They justified their absolute loyalty to Ali on the basis of his merits, precedent in Islam, his kinship with Muhammad, and also the announcement by the latter at the Ghadir Khumm. Many of these supporters also viewed Ali as the legatee of Muhammad and thus his rightful successor after his death, as evidenced in the poetry from the period and the inaugural address of Malik al-Ashtar.

Fiscal policies 
Ali opposed centralized control over provincial revenues. He also equally distributed the taxes and booty amongst Muslims, following the precedent of Muhammad and Abu Bakr. This practice may indicate the egalitarian views of Ali, who thus attempted to unravel the social order established under his predecessors: Umar distributed the state revenues according to perceived Islamic merit and precedence, which he apparently came to regret later as it replaced the Quranic principle of equality among the faithful. In turn, Uthman was widely accused of nepotism and corruption. In contrast, Talha and Zubayr were both Qurayshite companions of Muhammad who had amassed immense wealth under Uthman. They both revolted against Ali after the caliph refused to grant them favors. Some other figures among the Quraysh also turned against Ali for the same reason, write Ayoub and John McHugo. Ali is said to have even rejected a request by his brother Aqil for public funds, whereas Mu'awiya readily offered all of them bribes. Regarding taxation, Ali instructed his officials to collect payments on a voluntary basis and without harassment, and to prioritize the poor when distributing the funds. He directed Malik al-Ashtar in a letter to pay more attention to land development than short-term taxation.

Rules of war 
Ali is regarded as an authority for the rules of intra-Muslim war in Islamic jurisprudence. He forbade Muslim fighters from looting, and instead equally distributed the taxes as salaries among the warriors. With this ruling, Ali thus recognized his enemies' rights as Muslims. He also pardoned them in victory, and both of these practices were soon enshrined in the Islamic law. Beyond these measures, Ali has often been noted for his magnanimity to his defeated foes. He also advised al-Ashtar not to reject any call to peace and not to violate any agreements, and warned him against unlawful shedding of blood. He forbade his commanders from disturbing the civilians except when lost or in dire need of food. He further urged al-Ashtar to resort to war only when negotiations fail. He also ordered him to avoid commencing hostilities, and this Ali observed too in the Battle of the Camel and the Battle of Nahrawan. Ali barred his troops from killing the wounded and those who flee, mutilating the dead, entering homes without permission, looting, and harming the women. Veccia Vaglieri adds that Ali prevented the enslavement of women and children in victory, even though some protested. Prior to the Battle of Siffin with Mu'awiya, Ali did not retaliate and allowed his enemies to access drinking water when he gained the upper hand.

Battle of the Camel

When Aisha, a widow of Muhammad, learned about the accession of Ali in Medina, she stationed herself in Mecca and publicly blamed the assassination on him, and engaged in propaganda against the caliph. She was soon joined there by her close relatives, Talha and Zubayr, who thus broke their earlier oaths of allegiance to Ali. The triumvirate were joined, in turn, by the Umayyads, although their objectives were different, as the latter believed that the caliphate was their right after Uthman. The opposition to Ali decried his leniency towards the rebels, and accused him of complicity in the assassination. They demanded that Ali punish those responsible for the assassination of Uthman. They also called for the removal of Ali from office and for a (Qurayshite) council to appoint his successor. This removal of Ali was likely their primary goal, rather than vengeance for Uthman, against whom Talha, Zubayr, and Aisha had been active earlier. In particular, Talha and Aisha had likely written to the provinces to stir unrest. The latter had also publicly called for the death of Uthman shortly before his assassination. The caliphate of Ali had perhaps frustrated the political ambitions of Talha and Zubayr, and the Quraysh in general. For these, Ali represented the Ansar and the lower classes of the society. Fearing that he would end their privileged status as the ruling class of Islam, the Quraysh thus challenged Ali to safeguard their entitlements. In place of Ali, the opposition wished to restore the caliphate of Quraysh on the principles laid by Abu Bakr and Umar. Alternatively, Talha and Zubayr revolted after Ali refused to grant them favors. In particular, Ali did not offer the two any posts in his government, specifically the governorships of Basra and Kufa.

When the rebels failed to gain traction in Hijaz, they set out for Basra with several hundred soldiers. They captured Basra, killed many, and expelled Uthman ibn Hunaif, Ali's governor, after torturing him. Ali had set out in pursuit but failed to intercept them. In al-Rabadha, he thus changed direction to Kufa and sent delegates to raise an army there. However, Abu Musa al-Ash'ari, the governor of Kufa, called on the Kufans to remain neutral. The supporters of Ali thus expelled him from the town, and raised an army of six to twelve thousand men, which formed the core of Ali's forces in the coming battles. The two armies soon camped across from each other just outside of Basra, both numbered around 10,000 men by one account. Negotiations then began between Ali, Talha, and Zubayr to avoid the impending war. The talks apparently broke the resolve of Zubayr, who might have realized his small chances for the caliphate and the immorality of his bloody rebellion, according to Madelung. At the negotiations, Aisha's party demanded the removal of Ali from office and a council to elect his successor, but Ali countered that he was the legitimate caliph. The two sides also accused each other of responsibility in the assassination of Uthman. The negotiations thus failed after three days and the two sides readied for battle.

Account of the battle 
The battle took place on a December day in 656, lasting from noon to sunset. Ali is said to have barred his men from commencing hostilities. He ordered his forces to advance when the rebels killed Ali's envoy, thus blocking his last-ditch effort to avoid war. Aisha was also led onto the battlefield, riding in an armored palanquin atop a red camel, after which the battle is named. Talha was soon killed by the Umayyad's Marwan, another rebel, who apparently held the former responsible for the assassination of Uthman, or wanted to rid his kinsman, Mu'awiya, of a serious contender for the caliphate. Zubayr, an experienced fighter, left shortly after the battle began, but was pursued and killed. Madelung and Veccia Vaglieri suggest that it was the serious misgivings of Zubayr about the justice of their cause that led Zubayr to desertion. The deaths of Talha and Zubayr sealed the fate of the battle, despite the intense fighting that continued possibly for hours around Aisha's camel. The fighting stopped only when Ali's troops succeeded in killing Aisha's camel. She was nevertheless treated with respect, and later escorted back to Hejaz. Ali then announced a public pardon, setting free the war prisoners and prohibiting the enslavement of their women and children. The properties seized were to be returned to the enemy soldiers or their heirs.  The caliph instead compensated his army from the treasury of Basra. Ali also extended this pardon to high-profile rebels such as Marwan, who soon joined the court of Mu'awiya. For Madelung, that Ali released Marwan signals how little he was willing to engage in the ongoing political schemes of the civil war. Ali then appointed Ibn Abbas as the governor of Basra, and divided the treasury funds equally. The caliph soon set off for Kufa, arriving there in December 656 or January 657. He refused to reside in the governor's castle, calling it , and instead stayed with his nephew Ja'da ibn Hubayra. Kufa thus became Ali's main base of activity during his caliphate.

Battle of Siffin

Once in Kufa, Ali dispatched an envoy to Syria with a letter for its governor, Mu'awiya. The letter demanded his pledge of allegiance and added that he would be dismissed from his post, in which he had served under Umar and Uthman. Ali argued in his letter that his election in Medina was binding on Mu'awiya in Syria because he was elected by the same people who had pledged to his predecessors. The letter continued that the election of the caliph was the right of the Muhajiran and the Ansar, explicitly excluding Mu'awiya, as a late convert, from any  and from the caliphate itself. The letter also urged Mu'awiya to leave justice for Uthman to Ali, promising that he would deal with the issue in due course. In response to Ali's letter, Mu'awiya asked Jarir for time, then launched a propaganda campaign across Syria, charging Ali in the death of Uthman and calling for revenge. Mu'awiya was soon joined by Amr ibn al-As, a military strategist, who pledged to back the Umayyads against Ali in return for the life-long governorship of Egypt, from which he was earlier removed by Uthman. In turn, Amr incited against Uthman, and later publicly took some credit for his assassination by the Egyptian rebels. Amr is also credited with successfully spreading the rumor that Ali had killed Uthman. Mu'awiya soon privately visited Ali's emissary and proposed to recognize him in return for Syria and Egypt. When Ali rejected this proposal, Mu'awiya sent the envoy back to Kufa with a formal declaration of war which charged Ali with the murder of Uthman and vowed war. Thereafter would be a Syrian council to elect the next caliph, the declaration continued. Ali replied to this letter that he was innocent and that Mu'awiya's accusations lacked any evidence. As for handing Uthman's killers to Mu'awiya, Ali asked the latter to pledge allegiance and then present his case before Ali's court. With the exception of Kennedy, modern authors tend to consider Mu'awiya's call for revenge as a pretext for power grab, as evidenced by his secret offer to recognize Ali in return for Syria and Egypt.

Account of the battle 
The two sides prepared for war and faced each other in the summer of 36/657 at Siffin, west of the Euphrates. The number of troops is uncertain, perhaps 100,000 and 130,000 for Ali and Mu'awiya, respectively. As for their Islamic credentials, a considerable number of Muhammad's companions were present in Ali's army, whereas Mu'awiya could only boast a handful. The Syrians reached there first, and prevented the Iraqis from accessing the watering place. Soon, however, the Iraqis drove off the Syrians, though Ali permitted the enemies to freely access the water source. The two sides at Siffin engaged in skirmishes and negotiations, which continued for some three months, perhaps reflecting the reluctance for war. The negotiations failed nevertheless, possibly on 18 July 657, and prominent figures fought with small retinues before the main battle, which began on Wednesday, 26 July 657, and continued to Friday or Saturday morning. Ali probably refrained from initiating hostilities, and later fought together with his men on the frontline, whereas Mu'awiya led from his pavilion. Mu'awiya fared better overall on the first day, but his forces were pushed back by the Iraqis on the second day. Among those killed fighting for Mu'awiya on this day was Ubayd Allah, son of Umar, who had earlier fled to Syria when he learned that Ali intended to punish him for murdering some Persians innocent in the assassination of his father. On the other side, Ammar ibn Yasir, an octogenarian companion of Muhammad, was killed fighting for Ali on this day. In the canonical Sunni sources Sahih al-Bukhari and Sahih Muslim, a prophetic hadith predicts Ammar's death at the hands of  who call to hellfire. On the third day, Mu'awiya turned down the proposal to settle the matters in a personal duel with Ali. Urwa ibn Dawud al-Dimashqi volunteered to fight instead of Mu'awiya and was promptly "cleft in two" by Ali. After another indecisive day, heavy fighting continued throughout .

Call to arbitration 
By the next morning, the balance had moved in favor of Ali. Before noon, however, some of the Syrians raised pages of the Quran on their lances, shouting, "Let the Book of God be the judge between us." The fighting thus stopped at once. Ali is estimated to have lost 25,000 men by this point, while Mu'awiya might have lost 45,000 men. Battle was consistently Mu'awiya's position and his call for arbitration thus indicates that he had sensed imminent defeat, and this tends to be the view of modern authors, some of whom add that Mu'awiya was advised to do so by Amr ibn al-As. Ali is said to have exhorted his men to continue fighting, telling them to no avail that raising the Quran was for deception. Representing the  tribesmen of Kufa, the largest bloc in the army, al-Ash'ath ibn Qays told Ali that his clan would not fight for him if he refused the Syrians' call. Ali now recalled al-Ashtar, who is said to have advanced far towards the Syrian camp and initially refused to stop fighting. Facing strong peace sentiments in his army, Ali was thus compelled to accept the arbitration proposal, most likely against his own judgment.

Arbitration agreement 
Mu'awiya now conveyed his proposal that representatives from both sides should together reach a binding solution on the basis of the Quran. In Ali's camp, the majority pressed for the neutral Abu Musa, the erstwhile governor of Kufa, despite the opposition of Ali, who said he could not trust Abu Musa who had hindered the war preparations for the Battle of the Camel. The alternatives proposed by Ali were Ibn Abbas and al-Ashtar, both of whom were rejected by al-Ash'ath and other Yemenites, and also by the Iraqi . Ultimately, Ali and Mu'awiya were represented by, respectively, Abu Musa and Amr, of whom the latter acted solely in the interest of Mu'awiya. The arbitration agreement was written and signed by both parties on 15 Safar 37 (2 August 657), according to which the two representatives committed to meet on neutral territory, to adhere to the Quran and Sunna, and to save the community from war and division, a clause added evidently to appease the peace party. The two arbitrators were given about a year to come to a decision, and hostilities would resume if they failed. Two days after this agreement both armies left the battlefield. The arbitration agreement thus divided Ali's camp, as many there could not accept that he would negotiate with Mu'awiya, whose claims they considered fraudulent. It also handed Mu'awiya a moral victory as an equal contender for the caliphate.

Formation of the Kharijites 
As Ali returned to Kufa, some 12,000 of his men seceded and gathered outside of Kufa in protest to the arbitration agreement. Ali visited them and told them that they had opted for the arbitration despite his warnings. The seceders agreed and told Ali that they had repented for their sins and now demanded that Ali followed suit. To this, he responded with the general declaration, "I repent to God and ask for his forgiveness for every sin," and also ensured them that the judgment of the arbitrators would not be binding if they deviated from the Quran and Sunna. He thus largely regained their support at the time. But when the seceders returned to Kufa, they spread that Ali had nullified the arbitration agreement, which he denied, saying that he was committed to the formal agreement with Mu'awiya. Many of the dissidents apparently accepted Ali's position, while the rest left for al-Nahrawan, a town near al-Mada'in, and there declared Abd-Allah ibn Wahb al-Rasibi as their leader. These formed the Kharijites, who later took up arms against Ali in the Battle of Nahrawan (658). After being silent about it initially, the Syrians now said that they also wanted the arbitrators to judge whether the killing of Uthman was justified, about which the  had no doubts. The Kharijites adopted the slogan, "No judgment but that of God," highlighting their rejection of the arbitration (by men) in reference to the Quranic verse 49:9, "If two parties among the believers fall to fighting, make peace between them. If one of them aggresses against the other, fight those who aggress until they return to God’s Command. And if they return, make peace between them with justice and act equitably. Truly God loves the just." When they interrupted Ali's sermon with this slogan, he commented that it was a word of truth by which the seceders sought falsehood. He added that they were repudiating government even though a ruler was indispensable in the conduct of religion. Ali nevertheless did not bar their entry to mosques or deprive them of their shares in the treasury, saying that they should be fought only if they initiate hostilities.

Arbitration proceedings 
After some months of preparation, the two arbitrators met together in Dumat al-Jandal, halfway between Iraq and Syria, perhaps in Ramadan 37 (February 658), and the proceedings lasted for some weeks. With a strong preference for peace among Muslims, Abu Musa was probably willing to confirm Ali as the caliph, provided that he would reinstate Mu'awiya as the governor of Syria, who was well-liked by his troops, and on the condition that Mu'awiya would, in turn, recognize Ali as the caliph. Ideally, however, Abu Musa may have preferred a broad  that included Ali and Abd-Allah ibn Umar. The latter was his son-in-law and also favorite choice for the caliphate, even though Abd-Allah was probably not interested in it. Eventually, the arbitrators reached the verdict that Uthman had been killed wrongfully and that Mu'awiya had the right to seek revenge, but could not agree on anything else, either because Amr blocked the choice of Ali for the caliphate or a fresh , or because Abu Musa was adamant in his opposition to Mu'awiya. Rather than a judicial ruling, this was a political concession of Abu Musa, who might have hoped that Amr would later reciprocate this gesture. The verdict was not made public but both parties came to know about it anyway. In particular, Ali denounced the conduct of the two arbitrators as contrary to the Quran and began organizing a new expedition to Syria.  

Evidently not endorsed by Ali, there was also a second meeting in Udhruh in January 659, or in August-September 658, probably to discuss the succession to Ali. Not part of the arbitration process, this second meeting was solely an initiative of Mu'awiya, who also invited the sons of prominent companions to take part. The negotiations there failed eventually, as the two arbitrators could not agree on the next caliph: Amr supported Mu'awiya, while Abu Musa nominated his son-in-law Abd Allah ibn Umar, who stood down in the interest of unity by his own account, or more likely because he was intimidated by Mu'awiya, who also publicly threatened him in the closing gala.  In the public declaration that followed, Abu Musa deposed both Ali and Mu'awiya and called for a council to appoint the new caliph per his earlier agreement with Amr. When Amr took the stage, however, he deposed Ali but confirmed Mu'awiya as the new caliph, thus violating his agreement with Abu Musa. The Kufan delegation then reacted furiously to Abu Musa's concessions, and he fled to Mecca in disgrace, whereas Amr was well-received by Mu'awiya upon his return to Syria. The common view is that the arbitration failed, or was inconclusive. It nevertheless strengthened the Syrians' support for Mu'awiya and weakened the position of Ali.

Battle of Nahrawan

After the first arbitration, when Ali learned that Mu'awiya let people to pledge allegiance to him, he tried to gather a new army, and enlist Kharijites too, by assertion that he is going, as Kharijites wished, to fight against Mu'awiya. Kharijites, however, insisted that Ali should first repent of the infidelity which, in their view, he had committed by accepting arbitration. Ali angrily refused.
At this time, only the Ansar, the remnants of the Qurra led by Malik al-Ashtar, and a small number of men from their tribes remained loyal to Ali. He left Kufa with his new army to overthrow Mu'awiya.
While Ali was on his way to Levant, the Kharijites killed people with whom they disagreed. Therefore, Ali's army, especially al-Ash'ath ibn Qays, asked him to deal with the Kharijites first, because they felt insecure about their relatives and property. Thus, Ali first went to Nahrawan to interact with the opposition. Ali asked Kharigites to hand over the killers, but they asserted that they killed together; and that it was permissible to shed the blood of Ali's followers.

Ali and some of his companions asked the Kharijites to renounce enmity and war, but they refused. Ali then handed over the flag of amnesty to Abu Ayyub al-Ansari and announced that whoever goes to that flag, and whoever leaves Nahrawan, and has not committed a murder, is safe. Thus, hundreds of Kharijites separated from their army, except for 1500 or 1800 (or 2800) out of about 4000. Finally, Ali waited for the Kharijites to start the battle, and then attacked the remnants of their army with an army of about fourteen thousand men. It took place in 658 AD. Between 7 and 13 members of Ali's army were killed, while almost all Kharijites who drew their swords were killed and wounded.

Although it was reasonable and necessary, according to Madelung, to fight the bloodthirsty insurgents who openly threatened to kill others, but they were previously among the companions of Ali, and like Ali, were the most sincere believers in the Qur'an; and, according to Madelung, could have been among Ali's most ardent allies in opposing deviations from the Qur'an; but Ali could not confess his disbelief at their request or consider other Muslims infidels; or to ignore the murders they committed. After the battle, Ali intended to march directly to Levant, but Nahrawan killing, being condemned by many, also the escape of Ali's soldiers, forced him to return to Kufa and not to be able to march toward Mu'awiya. The wounded were taken to Kufa by Ali's troops to be cared for by their relatives.

The final years of Ali's caliphate
Following the Battle of Nahrawan, Ali's support weakened and he was compelled to abandon his second Syria campaign and return to Kufa. In addition to the demoralizing effect of the Battle of Nahrawan, another contributing factor might have been Ali's refusal to grant financial favors to the tribal chiefs, which left them vulnerable to bribery; Muawiya wrote to many of them, offering money and promises, in return for undermining Ali's war efforts. With the collapse of Ali's broad military coalition, Egypt fell in 658 to Muawiya, who killed Ali's governor and installed Amr ibn al-As. Muawiya also began to dispatch military detachments to terrorize the civilian population, killing those who did not recognize Muawiya as caliph and looting their properties.  These units, which were ordered to evade Ali's forces, targeted the areas along the Euphrates, the vicinity of Kufa, and most successfully, Hejaz and Yemen. Ali could not mount a timely response to these assaults. In the case of the raid led by Busr ibn Abi Artat in 661, the Kufans eventually responded to Ali's calls for jihad and routed Muawiya's forces only after the latter had reached Yemen. Ali was also faced with armed uprisings by the remnants of the Kharijites, as well as opposition in eastern provinces. However, as the extent of the rampage by Muawiya's forces became known to the public, it appears that Ali finally found sufficient support for a renewed offensive against Muawiya, set to commence in late winter 661. These plans were abandoned after Ali's assassination.

Death and burial

Ali was assassinated at the age of 62 or 63 by a Kharijite, ibn Muljam, who wanted revenge for the Battle of Nahrawan. Another report indicates that Ibn Muljam, along with two other Karijites, decided to assassinate Ali, Mu'awiya, and Amr ibn al-As simultaneously in order to rid Islam of the three men, who, in their view, were responsible for the civil war, but only succeeded in killing Ali. The date of his death has been reported differently. According to Shaykh al-Mufid, he was wounded on the 19th of Ramadan 40 AH (26 January 661 AD) and died two days later. Ali barred his sons from retaliating against the Kharijites, instead stipulating that, if he survived, Ibn Muljam would be pardoned whereas if he died, Ibn Muljam should be given only one equal hit, regardless of whether or not he died from the hit. Ali's eldest son, Hasan, followed these instructions and Ibn Muljam was executed in retaliation. According to some accounts, Ali had long known about his fate, either by his own premonition or through Muhammad, who had told Ali that his beard would be stained with the blood of his head. It is emphasized mainly in Shia sources that Ali, despite being aware of his fate at the hands of Ibn Muljam, did not take any action against him because, in Ali's words, "Would you kill one who has not yet killed me?"

According to Shaykh al-Mufid, Ali did not want his grave to be exhumed and profaned by his enemies. He thus asked to be buried secretly. It was revealed later during the Abbasid caliphate by Ja'far al-Sadiq that the grave was some miles from Kufa, where a sanctuary arose later and the city Najaf was built around it. Under the Safavid Empire, his grave became the focus of much devoted attention, exemplified in the pilgrimage made by Shah Ismail I to Najaf and Karbala.

Succession
After Ali's death, Kufi Muslims pledged their allegiance to his eldest son, Hasan, as Ali on many occasions had stated that only People of the House of Muhammad were entitled to lead the Muslim community.
At this time, Mu'awiya held both the Levant and Egypt, and had earlier declared himself caliph. He marched his army into Iraq, the seat of Hasan's caliphate. War ensued during which Mu'awiya gradually subverted the generals and commanders of Hasan's army until his army rebelled against him. Hasan was forced to cede the caliphate to Mu'awiya, according to the Hasan–Muawiya treaty, and the latter founded the Umayyad dynasty.
During their reign, the Umayyads kept Ali's family and his supporters, the Shia, under heavy pressure. Regular public cursing of Ali in the congregational prayers remained a vital institution until Umar ibn Abd al-Aziz abolished it sixty years later.
According to Madelung, during this period, "Umayyad highhandedness, misrule and repression were gradually to turn the minority of Ali's admirers into a majority. In the memory of later generations Ali became the ideal Commander of the Faithful."

Wives and children

Ali had fourteen sons and nineteen daughters from nine wives and several concubines, among them Hasan, Husayn and Muhammad ibn al-Hanafiyyah played a historical role, and only five of them left descendants. Ali had four children from Muhammad's youngest daughter, Fatima: Hasan, Husayn, Zaynab and Umm Kulthum. After Fatimah's death, he had other wives, including her niece Umamah bint Zainab, who bore for him Muhammad al-Awsat and 'Awn. His other well-known sons were Abbas, born to Umm al-Banin, and Muhammad ibn al-Hanafiyyah, from a freed slave girl named Khawla al-Hanafiyya.

Ali's descendants from Fatima are known as Sharif or Sayyid. They are revered by Shias and Sunnis as the only surviving generation of Muhammad. Ali had no other wives while Fatima was alive. Hasan was the eldest son of Ali and Fatima, and was the second Shia Imam. He also assumed the role of caliph for several months after Ali's death. In the year AH 50 he died after being poisoned by a member of his own household who, according to historians, had been motivated by Mu'awiya. Husayn was the second son of Ali and Fatima, and the third Shia Imam. He rebelled against Mu'awiya's son, Yazid, in 680 AD and was killed in the Battle of Karbala with his companions. In this battle, in addition to Husayn, six other sons of Ali were killed, four of whom were the sons of Umm al-Banin. Also, Hasan's three sons and Husayn's two children were killed in the battle.

Ali's dynasty considered the leadership of the Muslims to be limited to the Ahl al-Bayt and carried out several uprisings against rulers at different times. The most important of these uprisings are the battle of Karbala, the uprising of Mukhtar al-Thaqafi with Muhammad ibn al-Hanafiyyah, and the uprising of Zayd ibn Ali and his son Yahya against the Umayyads. Later, Ali's descendants also revolted against the Abbasids, and the most important of these uprisings were those of Shahid Fakhkh and Muhammad al-Nafs al-Zakiyya. While none of these uprisings were successful, the Idrisians, the Fatimids, and the Alawites of Tabarestan were finally able to form governments comprising Ali's descendants.

Works
Most works attributed to Ali were first delivered in the form of sermons and speeches and later committed to writing by his companions. Similarly, there are supplications, such as Du'a Kumayl, which he taught his companions.

Nahj al-Balagha

In the tenth century, al-Sharif al-Razi, a renowned Shia scholar, compiled a large number of sermons, letters, and sayings of Ali on various topics in Nahj al-Balagha, which has become one of the most popular and influential books in the Islamic world. Nahj al-Balagha has considerably influenced the field of Arabic literature and rhetoric, and is also considered an important intellectual, political work in Islam. According to Nasr, however, this book was almost completely ignored in Western research until the twentieth century. The authenticity of Nahj al-Balagha has been doubted by some Western scholars, and the attribution of the book to Ali and al-Razi has long been the subject of lively polemic debates among Shia and Sunni scholars, though recent academic research suggests that most of its content can indeed be attributed to Ali. In particular, Modarressi cites Madarek-e Nahj al-Balagha by Ostadi which documents Nahj al-Balagha through tracking down its content in earlier sources. Nevertheless, according to Nasr, the authenticity of the book has never been questioned by most Muslims and Nahj al-Balagha continues to be a religious, inspirational, and literary source among Shias and Sunnis. According to Gleave, the Shaqshaqiya Sermon of Nahj al-Balagha, in which Ali lays his claim to the caliphate and his superiority over his predecessors, namely, Abu bakr, Umar, and Uthman, is the most controversial section of the book. Ali's letter to Malik al-Ashtar, in which he outlines his vision for legitimate and righteous rule has also received considerable attention.

Ghurar al-Hikam wa Durar al-Kalim

Ghurar al-Hikam wa Durar al-Kalim was compiled by Abd al-Wahid Amidi, who, according to Gleave, was either a Shafi'i jurist or a Twelver. This book consists of over ten thousand short sayings of Ali.
These pietistic and ethical statements are collected from different sources, including Nahj al-Balagha and Mi'a kalima ( of Ali) by al-Jahiz.

Mus'haf of Ali

Mus'haf of Ali is said to be a copy of the Qur'an compiled by Ali, as one of the first scribes of the revelations. In his codex, Ali had likely arranged the chapters of the Qur'an by their time of revelation to Muhammad. There are reports that this codex also included interpretive material such as information about the abrogation of verses. Shia sources write that, after Muhammad's death, Ali offered this codex for official use but was turned down. Groups of Shias throughout history have believed in major differences between this Qur'an and the present Qur'an, though this view has been rejected by the Shia Imams and large numbers of Shia clerics and Qur'an scholars. Ali was also one of the main reciters of the Qur'an, and a recitation of him has survived, which, according to some scholars, is the same as the recitation of Hafs that has long been the standard version of the Qur'an.

Kitab Ali

Ali was seen writing in the presence of Muhammad and many narrations from the second century AH point to a collection of Muhammad's sayings by Ali, known as Kitab Ali. Another narration states that the jurist of Mecca was aware of this book in the early second century and was sure that it was written by Ali. As for the content of the book, it is said to have contained everything that people needed in matters of lawfulness and unlawfulness, such as a detailed penal code that accounted even for bodily bruises. Kitab Ali is also often linked to al-Jafr, which, in Shia belief, is said to contain esoteric teachings for Muhammad's household, dictated to Ali by Muhammad. The Twelver Shia believe that al-Jafr is now in the possession of the last Imam, Mahdi.

Other works
Du'a Kumayl is a supplication by Ali, well-known especially among the Shia, which he taught it to his companion, Kumayl ibn Ziyad. Kitab al-Diyat on Islamic law, attributed to Ali, contains instructions for calculating financial compensation for victims and is quoted in its entirety in Man La Yahduruhu al-Faqih, among others. The judicial decisions and executive orders of Ali during his caliphate were also recorded and committed to writing by his companions. Other materials attributed to Ali are compiled in Kitab al-Kafi of al-Kulayni and the many works of al-Saduq.

Ali is the first transmitter of several hundred hadiths, attributed to Muhammad, which have been compiled in different works under the title of Musnad Ali, often as part of larger collections of hadith, such as Musnad Ahmad ibn Hanbal, a canonical Sunni source. There are also multiple s that collect the poems attributed to Ali, though many of these poems are composed by others.

Personality
In person, according to Veccia Vaglieri, Ali is represented (in Sunni sources) as bald, heavy built, short-legged, with broad shoulders, a hairy body, a long white beard, and affected by eye inflammation. Shia accounts about the appearance of Ali are markedly different from Veccia Vaglieri's description and are said to better match his reputation as a capable warrior. Ali is featured heavily in Shia and Sufi artworks. In manner, Veccia Vaglieri writes that Ali was rough, brusque, and unsociable. Other sources, in contrast, describe Ali as cheerful, gentle, and generous. Encyclopaedia Islamica suggests that nearly all sects of Islam hold Ali up as a paragon of the essential virtues, above all, justice. Sa'sa'a ibn Suhan, a companion of Ali, is reported to have said that   
 

Accounts about Ali are sometimes tendentious, Veccia Vaglieri asserts, because the conflicts in which he was involved were perpetuated for centuries in polemical sectarian writings. Veccia Vaglieri gives Lammens's work as an example of hostile judgment towards Ali, and Caetani's writings as a milder one. However, neither Lammens nor Caetani, according to Veccia Vaglieri, took into consideration Ali's widely reported asceticism and piety, and their impact on his policies. Veccia Vaglieri notes that Ali fought against those whom he perceived as erring Muslims as a matter of duty, in order to uphold Islam. In victory, Ali was said to have been magnanimous, risking the protests of some of his supporters to prevent the enslavement of women and children. He showed his grief, wept for the dead, and even prayed over his enemies. Other have noted that Ali barred his troops from commencing hostilities in the Battle of the Camel and the Battle of Nahrawan. Prior to the Battle of Siffin, when his forces gained the upper hand, Ali is said to have refused to retaliate after Syrians cut off their access to drinking water. According to Veccia Vaglieri, even the apparent ambiguity of Ali's attitude towards the Kharijites might be explained by his religiosity, as he faced the painful dilemma of maintaining his commitment to the arbitration, though persuaded by the Kharijites that it was a sin. Shah-Kazemi describes Ali as slow to anger, happy to pardon, kind to the weak, and severe with the strong, which is how Ali portrayed a good (military) commander in his letter to Malik al-Ashtar.

Veccia Vaglieri suggests that Ali was narrow-minded and excessively rigorous in upholding his religious ideals and that he lacked political skill and flexibility, qualities that were abundantly present in Mu'awiya. According to Madelung, however, Ali did not compromise his principles for political self-gain, and refused to engage in the new game of political deception which ultimately deprived him of success in life but, in the eyes of his admirers, elevated him to a paragon of uncorrupted Islamic virtues, as well as pre-Islamic Arab chivalry. Tabatabai similarly writes that the rule of Ali was based more on righteousness than political opportunism, as evidenced by his insistence on removing those governors whom he viewed as corrupt, including Mu'awiya. According to Caetani, the divine aura that soon surrounded the figure of Ali originated in part from the impression he left on the people of his time. Expanding on this view, Veccia Vaglieri writes that what left that impression was Ali's social and economic reforms, rooted in his religious beliefs.

Names and titles

In the Islamic tradition, various names and titles have been attributed to Ali, some of which express his personal characteristics and some of which are taken from certain episodes of his life. Some of these titles are Abu al-Hasan, Abu Turab, Murtaza, Asadullah, Haydar, and especially among the Shias, Amir al-Mu'minin and Mawla al-Mottaqin. For example, the title Abu Turab might be a reference to when Muhammad entered the mosque and saw Ali sleeping covered by dust, and Muhammad told him, "O father of dust, get up." Veccia Vaglieri, however, suggests that this title was given to Ali by his enemies, and interpreted later as an honorific by invented accounts. Twelvers consider the title of Amir al-Mu'minin to be unique to Ali.

In Muslim culture

Ali's place in Muslim culture is said to be second only to that of Moḥammad. Afsaruddin and Nasr further suggest that, except for the prophet, more has been written about Ali in Islamic languages than anyone else. He retains his stature as an authority on Qur'anic exegesis and Islamic jurisprudence, and is regarded as a founding figure for Arabic rhetoric and grammar. Ali has also been credited with establishing the authentic style of Qur'anic recitation, and is said to have heavily influenced the first generation of Qur'anic commentators. He is central to mystical traditions within Islam, such as Sufism, and fulfills a high political and spiritual role in Shia and Sunni schools of thought. In Muslim culture, Madelung writes, Ali is respected for his courage, honesty, unbending devotion to Islam, magnanimity, and equal treatment of all Muslims. He is remembered, according to Jones, as a model of uncorrupted socio-political and religious righteousness. Esposito further suggests that Ali still remains an archetype for political activism against social injustice. Ali is also remembered as a gifted orator though Veccia Vaglieri does not extend this praise to the poems attributed to Ali.

In Qur'an 

According to Lalani, Ali regularly represented Muhammad in missions that were preceded or followed by Qur'anic injunctions. At an early age, Ali is said to have responded to Muhammad's call for help after the revelation of verse 26:214, which reads, "And warn thy clan, thy nearest of kin." Instead of Abu Bakr, there are Shia and Sunni accounts that it was Ali who was eventually tasked with communicating the chapter at-Tawbah of the Qur'an to Meccans, after the intervention of Gabriel. Ibn Abbas relates that it was when Ali facilitated Muhammad's safe escape to Medina by risking his life that verse 2:207 was revealed, praising him, "But there is also a kind of man who gives his life away to please God." The recipient of wisdom is said to be Ali in the Shia and some Sunni exegeses of verse 2:269, "He gives wisdom to whomever He wishes, and he who is given wisdom is certainly given an abundant good."

In the Verse of Purification, "... God desires only to remove defilement from you, o Ahl al-Bayt, and to purify you completely," Ahl al-Bayt is said to refer to Ali, Fatima, and their sons by Shia and some Sunni authorities, such as al-Tirmidhi. Similarly, Shia and some Sunni authors, such as Baydawi and Razi, report that, when asked about the Verse of Mawadda, "I ask no reward from you for this except love among kindred," Muhammad replied that "kindred" refers to Ali, Fatima, and their sons. After inconclusive debates with a Christian delegation from Najran, there are multiple Shia and Sunni accounts that Muhammad challenged them to invoke God's wrath in the company of Ali and his family, instructed by verse 3:61 of the Qur'an, known as the Verse of Mubahala. It has been widely reported that verses 76:5-22 of the Qur'an were revealed after Fatima, Ali, Hasan, and Husayn, gave away their only meal of the day to beggars who visited them, for three consecutive days.

In hadith literature
A great many hadiths, attributed to Muhammad, praise the qualities of Ali.

In Islamic philosophy and mysticism
Ali is credited by some, such as Nasr and Shah-Kazemi, as the founder of Islamic theology, and his words are said to contain the first rational proofs among Muslims of the Unity of God. Ibn Abil-Hadid writes that 
As for theosophy and dealing with matters of divinity, it was not an Arab art. Nothing of the sort had been circulated among their distinguished figures or those of lower ranks. This art was the exclusive preserve of Greece, whose sages were its only expounders. The first one among Arabs to deal with it was Ali.

In later Islamic philosophy, especially in the teachings of Mulla Sadra and his followers, such as Allameh Tabatabai, Ali's sayings and sermons were increasingly regarded as central sources of metaphysical knowledge or divine philosophy. Members of Sadra's school regard Ali as the supreme metaphysician of Islam. According to Corbin, Nahj al-Balagha may be regarded as one of the most important sources of doctrines used by Shia thinkers, especially after 1500. Its influence can be sensed in the logical co-ordination of terms, the deduction of correct conclusions, and the creation of certain technical terms in Arabic which entered the literary and philosophical language independent of the translation into Arabic of Greek texts.

In Sunni Islam

Ali is highly regarded in Sunni thought as one of Rashidun (Rightly-Guided) Caliphs and a close companion of Muhammad. The incorporation of Ali into Sunni orthodoxy, however, might have been a late development, according to Gleave, dating back to Ahmad ibn Hanbal. Later on, Sunni authors regularly reported Ali's legal, theological, and historical views in their works, and some particularly sought to depict him as a supporter of Sunni doctrine.

In Sunni thought, Ali is seen sometimes as inferior to his predecessors, in line with the Sunni doctrine of precedence, which assigns higher religious authority to earlier caliphs. These hadiths have been reinterpreted accordingly. For instance, some have interpreted  as financial dependence because Ali was raised in Muhammad's household as a child. Some Sunni writers, on the other hand, acknowledge the preeminence of Ali in Islam but do not consider that a basis for political succession.

In Shia Islam

It is difficult to overstate the significance of Ali in Shia belief and his name, next to Muhammad's, is incorporated into Shia's daily call to prayer. In Shia Islam, Ali is considered the first Imam and the belief in his rightful succession to Muhammad is an article of faith among Shia Muslims, who also accept the superiority of Ali over the rest of companions and his designation by Muhammad as successor. In Shia belief, by the virtue of his imamate, Ali inherited both political and religious authority of Muhammad, even before his ascension to the caliphate. Unlike Muhammad, however, Ali was not the recipient of a divine revelation, though he is believed to have been guided by divine inspiration in Shia theology. Shia Muslims believe in the infallibility of Ali, citing the Verse of Purification, among others. In Shia view, Ali also inherited the esoteric knowledge of Muhammad. Among the evidence to support this view is often the well-attested hadith, "I [Muhammad] am the city of knowledge, and Ali is his gate." According to Momen, most Shia theologians agree that Ali did not inherently possess the knowledge of unseen, though glimpses of this knowledge was occasionally at his disposal. Shia Muslims believe that Ali is endowed with the privilege of intercession on the day of judgment, citing, for instance, verse 10:3 of the Qur'an, which includes the passage, "There is no one that can intercede with Him, unless He has given permission."

Ali's words and deeds are considered as a model for the Shia community and a source of sharia law for Shia jurists. Ali's piety and morality initiated a kind of mysticism among the Shias that shares some commonalities with Sufism. Musta'lis consider Ali's position to be superior to that of an Imam. Shia extremists, known as Ghulat, believed that Ali had access to God's will. For example, the Nuṣayrīs considered Ali to be an incarnation of God. Some of them (e.g. Khattabiyya, Saba'iyya) regarded Ali to be superior to Muhammad and were dissociated by him.

In Sufism
Sufis believe that Ali inherited from Muhammad the saintly power, that makes the spiritual journey to God possible. Ali is the spiritual head of some Sufi movements and nearly all Sufi orders trace their lineage to Muhammad through him, an exception being Naqshbandis, who reach Muhammad through Abu Bakr. According to Gleave, even the Naqshbandis include Ali in their spiritual hierarchy by depicting how Muhammad taught him the rituals of Sufism, through which believers may reach certain stages on the Sufi path. In Sufism, Ali is regarded as the founder of Jafr, the occult science of the symbolic significance of the Arabic alphabet letters.

Historiography

Much has been written about Ali in historical texts, second only to Muhammad, according to Nasr and Afsaruddin. The primary sources for scholarship on the life of Ali are the Qur'an and hadiths, as well as other texts of early Islamic history. The extensive secondary sources include, in addition to works by Sunni and Shia Muslims, writings by Arab Christians, Hindus, and other non-Muslims from the Middle East and Asia and a few works by modern western scholars. Since the character of Ali is of religious, political, jurisprudential, and spiritual importance to Muslims (both Shia and Sunni), his life has been analyzed and interpreted in various ways. In particular, many of the Islamic sources are colored to some extent by a positive or negative bias towards Ali.

The earlier western scholars, such as Caetani (d. 1935), were often inclined to dismiss as fabricated the narrations and reports gathered in later periods because the authors of these reports often advanced their own Sunni or Shia partisan views. For instance, Caetani considered the later attribution of historical reports to Ibn Abbas and Aisha as mostly fictitious since the former was often for and the latter was often against Ali. Caetani instead preferred accounts reported without  by the early compilers of history like Ibn Ishaq. Madelung, however, argues that Caetani's approach was inconsistent and rejects the indiscriminate dismissal of late reports. In Madelung's approach, tendentiousness of a report alone does not imply fabrication. Instead, Madelung and some later historians advocate for discerning the authenticity of historical reports on the basis of their compatibility with the events and figures.

Until the rise of the Abbasid Caliphate, few books were written and most of the reports had been oral. The most notable work prior to this period is the Book of Sulaym ibn Qays, attributed to a companion of Ali who lived before the Abbasids. When affordable paper was introduced to Muslim society, numerous monographs were written between 750 and 950. For instance, according to Robinson, at least twenty-one separate monographs were composed on the Battle of Siffin in this period, thirteen of which were authored by the renowned historian Abu Mikhnaf. Most of these monographs are, however, not extant anymore except for a few which have been incorporated in later works such as History of the Prophets and Kings by Muhammad ibn Jarir al-Tabari (d. 923). More broadly, ninth- and tenth-century historians collected, selected, and arranged the available monographs.

See also

 Outline of Islam
 Glossary of Islam
 Index of Islam-related articles

 Alevism
 Ali in Muslim culture
 Al-Farooq (title)
 Ghurabiya
 Hashemites Royal Family of Jordan
 Idris I The First King of Morocco Founded 788
 List of expeditions of Ali during Muhammad's era

Notes

References

Bibliography

Books

 

 

 Translated by Liadain Sherrard, Philip Sherrard.

 

 

 

 

 

 

 

 

 

 

 
Front Cover

Encyclopedias

Encyclopaedia Iranica

Encyclopaedia of Islam

Encyclopaedia Islamica

Others

Journals

Further reading

External links

Shia biography
 Website devoted to the Life of Imam Ali ibn Abi Talib
 A Biographical Profile of Imam Ali  by Syed Muhammad Askari Jafari
 Online Biography by Witness-Pioneer

Quotes
 A Website featuring validated/referenced quotes of Imam Ali ibn Abi Talib
 "Shadow of the Sun" published on first Shia Imam, a collection of 110 hadiths from Prophet (s) concerning the character of Ali.

Ali
600 births
661 deaths
7th-century caliphs
7th-century judges
7th-century rulers in Asia
Arab generals
Arab politicians
Assassinated caliphs
Assassinated Shia imams
Deified people
Family of Muhammad
Arab Muslims
Deaths by blade weapons
Islamic philosophers
Writers of the medieval Islamic world
People of the First Fitna
People from Mecca
Philanthropists
Rashidun caliphs
Sahabah martyrs
Sahabah who participated in the battle of Uhud
Sahabah who participated in the battle of Badr
Shia imams
Zaydi imams
Twelve Imams